In mathematics, the reciprocal difference of a finite sequence of numbers  on a function  is defined inductively by the following formulas:

See also
Divided differences

References

Finite differences